Seoga & Cook is a restaurant chain based in South Korea owned by the S&S Company. As of 2014, the chain had over 77 retail stores in South Korea.

References

External links
 

South Korean brands
Restaurant chains in South Korea